Barucco is a surname. Notable people with the surname include:

Alberto Barucco (1906–?), Argentine sprinter
Giacomo Barucco (1582– 1630), Italian painter

See also
 Barocco
 Barrueco

Italian-language surnames